= Sabah FC =

Sabah FC may refer to:

- Sabah FC (Azerbaijan)
- Sabah F.C. (Malaysia)
